Farai Bright-Garamukanwa (born 3 June 1999) is a British male acrobatic gymnast. For their first major international competition, Kieran Whittle and Farai Bright-Garamukanwa achieved bronze in the 2014 Acrobatic Gymnastics World Championships.

References

1999 births
Living people
British acrobatic gymnasts
Male acrobatic gymnasts
Medalists at the Acrobatic Gymnastics World Championships
21st-century British people